The IMOCA 60 class yacht Union Bancaire Privee was designed by Finot-Conq and launched in 1999 after being made by JMV in Cherbourg in France.

Racing results

References 

1990s sailing yachts
Sailing yachts designed by Finot-Conq
Sailboat type designs by Groupe Finot
Vendée Globe boats
IMOCA 60
Sailboat types built in France